The Grande Ronde River Bridge, near Asotin in Asotin County in southeast Washington, is a riveted steel girder bridge which was built in 1941.  It is notable as the first, or one of the first, steel girder bridges in the Washington State highway system, and was a prototype for later ones. It was listed on the National Register of Historic Places in 1995.

It was built for the Washington State Highway Department by contractor Henry Hagman using steel fabricated by the Clinton Bridge Company of Clinton, Iowa.  R. W. Finke was the bridge engineer.

Its NRHP nomination states:
Although the bridge is lacking overt artistic features, its design is particularly appropriate to the unique character of the location. The simple horizontal lines of the bridge complement the basalt outcrops rising abruptly in layered formations from the valley floor. The bridge's configuration and type of construction appear to have been an excellent engineering solution for this particular river crossing.

References

Road bridges on the National Register of Historic Places in Washington (state)
Bridges completed in 1941
Asotin County, Washington
Cantilever bridges in the United States
Girder bridges in the United States
Steel bridges in the United States